HF Sinclair Corporation (HF Sinclair) is a diversified energy company that manufactures and sells products such as gasoline, diesel fuel, jet fuel, renewable diesel, specialty lubricant products, specialty chemicals, and specialty and modified asphalt, among others.  It is based in Dallas, Texas.

The company operates seven complex oil refineries with a total crude oil processing capacity of 678,000 barrels per stream day. It has facilities in Cheyenne, Wyoming (52,000 barrels per day), El Dorado, Kansas (coking refinery - 135,000 bbl/d), Artesia, New Mexico (100,000 bbl/d), Tulsa, Oklahoma (125,000 bbl/d), Woods Cross, Utah (45,000 bbl/d), Sinclair, WY and Casper, WY.  It operates three lubricants and specialties facilities in Mississauga (15,600 bbl/d), Petrolia, PA and in the Netherlands. The company also operates asphalt terminals in Arizona, New Mexico, and Oklahoma.

The company ranked 279th in the 2021 Fortune 500, based on its 2020 revenue.

History
The company was incorporated under the name General Appliance Corporation in 1947 and changed its name to Holly Corporation in 1952.

In 2003, Frontier Oil agreed to acquire Holly but Holly later cancelled the merger, leading to litigation.

In 2009, Holly Corporation acquired 2 refineries in Tulsa, Oklahoma: one from Sinclair Oil Corporation for $128 million and one from Sunoco.

In July 2011, Holly Corporation and Frontier Oil merged forming HollyFrontier Corporation.

In February 2017, the company acquired Suncor Energy's Petro-Canada Lubricants unit in Mississauga, Ontario, Canada for C$1.125 billion.

In early 2019, HollyFrontier acquired Sonneborn, a manufacturer of food grade white mineral oils and waxes in Petrolia, Pennsylvania, for $655 million.

In June 2020, HollyFrontier announced its Cheyenne refinery will cease processing petroleum, instead shifting production solely to renewable fuel, with the loss of approximately 200 workers.

In May 2021, HollyFrontier agreed to purchase the Shell Anacortes Refinery near Anacortes, Washington, with capacity of 149,000 bbl/d, for $350 million.

In August 2021, HollyFrontier agreed to purchase the assets of Sinclair Oil Corporation, including its two refineries near Casper, Wyoming, and Sinclair, Wyoming, for $2.6 billion. The succeeding company, HF Sinclair Corporation, is expected to finalize the merger mid-2022.

In March 14, 2022, HollyFrontier and Holly Energy Partners announced the completion of transactions with The Sinclair Companies and the establishment of the new parent company, HF Sinclair Corporation (NYSE:DINO).

In July 2022 HF Sinclair laid off approximately 97 people in the Sinclair, Wyoming refinery.

References

External links
 
 

1947 establishments in Texas
American companies established in 1947
Companies based in Dallas
Companies listed on the New York Stock Exchange
Energy companies established in 1947
Non-renewable resource companies established in 1947
Oil companies of the United States
Oil pipeline companies
Petroleum in Texas